Harry Eugene Drake (born in Kansas on May 7, 1915 – July 28, 1997 died in Nevada) was an archer and bowyer. Drake was an early pioneer in work on modern implementations of the composite bow design.

Biography
Drake broke the world record for the longest shot with a footbow on October 24, 1971, with a shot that flew  (one mile, 268 yards or 1.854 kilometers)    The record stood until 1983, when a new mark of 1.873 km was set.

References

External links 
 Harry Drake at the Bowhunters Hall of Fame

1915 births
1997 deaths
Bowyers
American male archers